Duncan Carmichael (8 November 1915 – 28 November 1984) was an English cricketer. He played nine first-class matches for Cambridge University Cricket Club between 1936 and 1937.

See also
 List of Cambridge University Cricket Club players

References

External links
 

1915 births
1984 deaths
English cricketers
Cambridge University cricketers
People from Jalpaiguri